Alfréd Hajós (1 February 1878 – 12 November 1955) was a Hungarian swimmer, football player and manager, and architect. He was the first modern Olympic swimming champion and the first Olympic champion of Hungary. No other swimmer ever won such a high fraction of all Olympic events at a single Games. He was also part of the first-ever team fielded by Hungary in 1902.

Biography
Hajós was born in Budapest, Hungary, as Arnold Guttmann, to a family of Jewish background. He was 13 years old when he felt compelled to become a good swimmer after his father drowned in the Danube River. He took the name Hajós (sailor in Hungarian) for his athletic career because it was a Hungarian name.

In 1896, Hajós was an architecture student in Hungary when the Athens Games took place.  He was allowed to compete, but permission from the university to miss class was difficult to obtain. When he returned to the Dean of the Polytechnical University, the dean did not congratulate Hajós on his Olympic success, but instead said: "Your medals are of no interest to me, but I am eager to hear your replies in your next examination."

At the 1896 Games, the swimming events were held in the Mediterranean Sea battling the elements. He won the 100-metre freestyle with a time of 1:22.2, and the 1,200-metre freestyle in 18:22.1. Hajós wanted to win all three distances, but the 500-metre freestyle was immediately after the 100 and immediately before the 1,200. Before the 1,200-metre race, he smeared his body with a half-inch (one centimetre) thick layer of grease, but it proved to be of little protection against the cold. He confessed after winning the race that, "My will to live completely overcame my desire to win." While at a dinner honoring Olympic winners, the Crown Prince of Greece asked Hajós where he had learned to swim so well. Hajós replied, "In the water." The next morning, the Athenian journal Acropolis depicted Alfréd with the subtitle: "Hungarian Dolphin". He was the youngest winner in Athens.

Prior to the Athens Olympics, Hajós was the 100 metre freestyle European swimming champion in 1895 and 1896.

A versatile athlete, he won Hungary's 100 metre sprint championship in 1898, as well as the National 400 metre hurdles and discus titles. He also played as a forward in Hungary's national football championship between 1901 and 1903, and on 12 October 1902, he again went down in history as one of the eleven footballers who played in the first international match played by the Hungarian national team, captaining his side in a 0–5 loss to Austria in Vienna. Between 1897 and 1904 he was also a football referee, and during 1906 he was the coach of Hungary's national football team, leading the nation in three games (two draws and 1 win).

In 1924, Hajós, an architect specializing in sport facilities, entered the art competitions at the Paris Olympic Games. His plan for a stadium, devised together with Dezső Lauber (who played tennis in the 1908 Summer Olympics), was awarded the silver medal; the jury did not award a gold medal in the competition. Thus making him one of only two Olympians ever to have won medals in both sport and art Olympic competitions.

The best known sports facility designed by Hajós is the Alfréd Hajós National Swimming Stadium built on Margitsziget (Margaret Island) in the Danube in Budapest, which was built in 1930, and used for the 1958, 2006 and 2010 European Aquatics Championships, and the 2006 FINA Men's Water Polo World Cup.

In 1953, the International Olympic Committee awarded him the Olympic diploma of merit. He is a member of the International Swimming Hall of Fame, and in 1981 he was also made a member of the International Jewish Sports Hall of Fame.

His brother, Henrik Hajós, won gold medal in 4x250 m Freestyle swimming at 1906 Olympic Games in Athens.

Buildings
His first designs were in Art Nouveau and eclectic style, later he turned to modernism and was influenced by Italian styles.

 Hotel Aranybika, Debrecen
 Gymnasium of Janko Francisci - Rimavský, (Levoča, 1913)
 Protestant Church Centre, Budapest
 Újpest FC's UTE Stadium, Újpest, Megyeri ut (1922)
 Swimming Stadium, Budapest, Margitsziget (today it bears his name)
 Millenáris Sportpálya, Budapest XIV
 Sports ground, Miskolc
 Sports ground, Pápa
 Sports ground, Szeged
 Sports ground, Kaposvár
 Girls' School (Hungarian: III. állam polgári leányiskola Pozsonyban, Slovak: III. štátna meštianska škola dievčenská v Bratislave) 1914, Bratislava
 Népkert Vigadó, Miskolc, Népkert
 Swimbath, Szeged (Ligetfürdő, 1930)

Gallery

See also
 List of members of the International Swimming Hall of Fame
List of select Jewish swimmers

References

External links
 
 
 
 The Hajós Alfréd Társaság, the Alfréd Hajós Society
 Alfréd Hajós in International Jewish Sports Hall of Fame
 Alfréd Hajós at Jewish.hu's list of famous Hungarians
 

1878 births
1955 deaths
Hungarian male swimmers
Hungarian football managers
Hungarian architects
Olympic swimmers of Hungary
Swimmers at the 1896 Summer Olympics
19th-century sportsmen
Olympic gold medalists for Hungary
Olympic silver medalists in art competitions
Sportspeople from Budapest
Austro-Hungarian Jews
Jewish Hungarian sportspeople
Jewish swimmers
Jewish architects
Art Nouveau architects
Medalists at the 1924 Summer Olympics
Medalists at the 1896 Summer Olympics
Hungarian male freestyle swimmers
Olympic gold medalists in swimming
Hungarian footballers
Hungary international footballers
Olympic competitors in art competitions
Association football forwards
Budapesti TC players
Sportspeople from the Austro-Hungarian Empire